Bakhtiar (also Romanized as Bakhtīār and Bakhtiyar; also known as Garāvand-e Bakhteyār, Garāvand-e Bakhtīār, and Gazāvand-e Bakhtiār) is a village in Rud Zard Rural District, in the Central District of Bagh-e Malek County, Khuzestan Province, Iran. At the 2006 census, its population was 85, in 30 families.

References 

Populated places in Bagh-e Malek County